Non-brewed condiment is a malt vinegar substitute created with water, acetic acid, flavourings and often caramel colour, sometimes used in fish-and-chip shops in the United Kingdom and Ireland. It is also used in salads.

Traditional vinegars are made by fermenting alcohol (wine, in the case of wine vinegar; cider for cider vinegar; and an ale made from malted barley in the case of malt vinegar). The fermentation process takes time, and all the colours in the vinegar occur naturally.

Non-brewed condiment is acetic acid mixed with colourings and flavourings, making its manufacture a much quicker and cheaper process than the production of vinegar. According to Trading Standards in the UK, it cannot be labelled as vinegar or even put in traditional vinegar bottles if it is being sold or put out on counters in fish-and-chip shops.

Origin of the term
According to Arthur Slater, writing in the August 1970 edition of Industrial Archaeology, the Chief Metropolitan Magistrate ruled in a 1949 prosecution at Bow Street Magistrates' Court that the term non-brewed vinegar, which up until then had been used to market such acetic-acid solutions, was in contravention of the Merchandise Marks Act 1926 as it constituted a false trade description. The decision was upheld on appeal to the King's Bench Division. Mr Slater goes on to state that after the unsuccessful appeal the trade association concerned announced that in future their product would be sold as non-brewed condiment.

See also

 List of condiments

References

British condiments
Vinegar